Wojciech Michał Knapik (born July 24, 1980 in Opole) is a Polish sport shooter. Since 2001, Knapik had won a total of four medals at the ISSF World Cup circuit, including gold for the 10 m air pistol (2003 in Changwon, South Korea).

Knapik made his official debut at the 2004 Summer Olympics in Athens, where he finished eleventh in the men's 10 m air pistol, with a score of 580 points, tying his position with four-time Olympian and two-time silver medalist Igor Basinski of Belarus. He also competed in the men's 50 m pistol event, where he was able to shoot a total of 536 targets, finishing only in thirty-ninth place.

At the 2008 Summer Olympics in Beijing, Knapik competed for the second time in two pistol shooting events. He placed twenty-fourth out of forty-eight shooters in the men's 10 m air pistol, with a total score of 577 points. Three days later, Knapik competed for his second event, 50 m rifle pistol, where he was able to fire 10 shots each in six attempts, for a total score of 543 points, finishing again in thirty-ninth place.

Olympic results

References

External links
ISSF Profile
NBC 2008 Olympics profile 

Polish male sport shooters
Living people
Olympic shooters of Poland
Shooters at the 2004 Summer Olympics
Shooters at the 2008 Summer Olympics
Sportspeople from Opole
1980 births
Shooters at the 2015 European Games
European Games competitors for Poland